Liam Hennessy may refer to:

 Liam Hennessy (footballer) (born 1932), former Irish football player
 Liam Hennessy (coach) (born 1958), coach and former international pole vaulting athlete